Tephereth Israel Synagogue is a synagogue at 76 Winter Street in downtown New Britain, Connecticut.  The Orthodox congregation, founded in 1925, meets at a two-story brick temple with Colonial Revival and Renaissance features, designed by Hartford architect Adolf Feinberg and built in 1925.  The building was listed on the National Register of Historic Places in 1995.

Architecture and history
Tephereth Israel Synagogue is located a few blocks northeast of downtown New Britain, on the north side of Winter Street west of Martin Luther King Jr. Drive.  It is a two-story masonry structure, built out of red brick with stone trim.  Square towers flank a central entry section, which has three entrances at the top of a broad series of steps.  The entrances are set in round-arch openings with keystones, as are the windows set above them.  The towers have brick corner quoining, with tall round-arch windows, above which are stone panels bearing the Star of David.  The interior is arranged with a social hall and classroom space on the ground floor, and the main sanctuary on the upper level.  The fixtures of the sanctuary date to the period after a 1962 fire.  Services are usually conducted every Saturday morning, led by Rabbi Robert Schectman.

The synagogue was built in 1925, following a doctrinal split in New Britain's Jewish community.  The city's first congregation, Ahey B'Nai Israel, was formally adopted as a Conservative organization, and more recently arrived Orthodox adherents broke off to form Tephereth Israel.  The building is an architecturally distinctive blend of Romanesque and Colonial Revival features.

See also
National Register of Historic Places listings in Hartford County, Connecticut

References

Synagogues in Connecticut
Synagogues on the National Register of Historic Places in Connecticut
Synagogues completed in 1925
Buildings and structures in Hartford County, Connecticut
Romanesque Revival synagogues
National Register of Historic Places in Hartford County, Connecticut
1925 establishments in Connecticut